Chenai may refer to:
 Chennai, a city in India
 Chenai (Thessaly), an ancient city-state of Thessaly, Greece